Sillago shaoi is a species of marine fish in the smelt-whiting family Sillaginidae. It is found in Western Pacific, from the Taiwan Strait between Taiwan and China.

Entomology
The fish is named in honor of ichthyologist Kwang-Tsao Shao (b. 1951),  of the National Taiwan Ocean University.

References

Sillaginidae
Taxa named by Gao Tian-Xiang
Taxa named by Xiao Jia-Guang
Fish described in 2016